Philipp von Rothenstein (died 21 March 1604) was the Prince-Bishop of Worms from 1596 to 1604.  He was appointed bishop on July 15, 1596, and died in office on March 21, 1604.

References

1604 deaths
Roman Catholic bishops of Worms
Year of birth unknown